Communist Party Opposition was a Swiss communist party 1930–1935, connected to the German Communist Party Opposition. It was the Swiss affiliate to the International Communist Opposition.

History 
The KPO-Switzerland came into being in 1930, when members of the Swiss Communist Party who were critical to negative of the social fascism and RGO policy of the Comintern and who advocated a united front policy with social democracy were excluded from it or left it. This concerned the almost complete party organization in the canton of Schaffhausen around Walther Bringolf , Hermann Erb and Hermann Huber(which was created in the early 1920s when the entire Schaffhausen social democracy converted) together with the Arbeiter-Zeitung that appeared there daily, as well as smaller groups around Moritz Mandel and Ernst Illi in Zurich , around Paul Thalmann in Basel and in a few other places in German-speaking Switzerland .

In Schaffhausen, the KPO-Switzerland was the determining political force within the workers' movement . Bringolf was again elected in 1931 as one of two representatives of the canton in the National Council and in 1932 was elected mayor of Schaffhausen ; the party also dominated the SGB there . At the international level, the KPO-Switzerland was affiliated with the IVKO and initially maintained close contact with the German Communist Party opposition around Heinrich Brandler and August Thalheimer and supported their resistance activities after the transfer of power to the NSDAP1933

At the same time, the shock of National Socialist rule in the neighboring country to the north encouraged tendencies within the party to work towards re-establishing unity with the two major workers' parties. Negotiations with the KPS were unsuccessful, talks with the SP led to a gradual transfer to the latter, which was completed in 1935. A small Trotskyist -oriented minority of the members around Paul Thalmann had already left the party in order to work in the SP in an entryist manner.

References

Stub 
Defunct communist parties in Switzerland
Right Opposition
Political parties established in 1930
1930 establishments in Switzerland
Political parties disestablished in 1935
1935 disestablishments in Switzerland